"All I Do" is a song written and performed by Ian Thomas. It was later recorded by Daryl Braithwaite as the second single from his second studio album, Edge.

Track listing
CD single
 "All I Do"
 "The Promise Land"

CD Maxi single
 "All I Do"	
 "Up-Out" (Andy Cichin, Daryl Braithwaite, Jef Scott, John Watson, Scott Griffiths, Simon Hussey)
 "The Promise Land" (Scott)

Charts

References

1988 songs
1988 singles
Songs written by Ian Thomas (Canadian musician)
CBS Records singles